Carl Weinrich (July 2, 1904 – May 13, 1991) was an American organist, choral conductor, and teacher. He was particularly known for his recitals and recordings of Bach's organ music and as a leader in the revival of Baroque organ music in the United States during the 1930s.

Biography
Weinrich was born in Paterson, New Jersey, and began studying the organ when he was six years old. In addition to private study with Mark Andrews, Marcel Dupré, and Lynnwood Farnam, he received degrees from New York University in 1927 and the Curtis Institute of Music in 1930. Upon Farnam's death in 1930, Weinrich succeeded him as the organist at the Church of the Holy Communion in New York City. Weinrich was the organist, choirmaster, and Director of Music at Princeton University Chapel from 1943 to 1973. He also taught at Westminster Choir College, Wellesley College, Vassar College, and Columbia University, performed a recital series at Harvard University, and published a monograph on "Albert Schweitzer's Contribution to Organ-building". In 1955 he was the guest recitalist and lecturer at Northwestern University's annual church music conference.

Although primarily known for his performances of Baroque music, Weinrich also performed many 20th-century organ works, including the premieres of Samuel Barber's Prelude and Fugue in B Minor, Louis Vierne's Organ Symphony No. 6 in B minor, and Arnold Schoenberg's Variations on a Recitative (Op. 40). Carl Weinrich died in Princeton, New Jersey at the age of 86 after suffering from Parkinson's disease for several years. Amongst his students were the composer Betsy Jolas, the composer and organist George Lynn, and the musicologist and critic Joseph Kerman.

Recordings
In 1951, Weinrich was signed by the MGM Records label to record a multi-volume series of LPs comprising all of Johann Sebastian Bach's organ compositions. 
While MGM did begin this series, recording Weinrich at Princeton Chapel in New Jersey, they only recorded and released a small sampling of Bach's organ works. However, several years later, Weinrich began the process of recording Bach's complete organ works for Westminster Records, this time on Vårfrukyrka church's organ in Skänninge, Sweden. The recordings completed in 1956 and were released over several years; they included most of Bach's published works for organ, including the major chorale collections and free works. Later LP volumes appeared on Westminster's successor label Music Guild/ABC.

A sampling of Weinrich's other recordings includes:
Fantasia In Echo Style (Jan Pieterszoon Sweelinck), Musicraft, 1938
Onward, Christian Soldiers and Other Beloved Hymns, RCA Victor, 1949
Israel in Egypt (George Frideric Handel), Princeton University, 1956
Bach Organ Music, RCA Victor, 1962
Bach Organ Music, vol. 2, RCA Victor, 1963
Romantic Organ Music, RCA Victor, 1964
Funeral Anthem on the Death of Queen Caroline (George Frideric Handel), Princeton University, 1964
Christmas Music of the Baroque (Dietrich Buxtehude, Johann Pachelbel, Fridolin Sicher, Arnolt Schlick, Louis Claude Daquin, Johann Sebastian Bach), RCA Victor, 1965
Organ Music of the Bach Family (Carl Philipp Emanuel Bach, Johann Bernhard Bach, Johann Michael Bach, Johann Christoph Bach, Wilhelm Friedemann Bach, Johann Sebastian Bach), RCA Victor, 1965
The Sonatas for Organ and Orchestra (Wolfgang Amadeus Mozart, Joseph Haydn), RCA Victor, 1967
 Mass in E minor (Anton Bruckner), Musical Heritage Society, 1974
Concertos (George Frideric Handel, Felix Mendelssohn, Sergei Rachmaninoff, Joseph Haydn), Time–Life Records, 1980

Notes

1904 births
1991 deaths
20th-century American male musicians
20th-century American musicians
20th-century classical musicians
20th-century organists
American classical organists
American male organists
Classical musicians from New Jersey
Columbia University faculty
Curtis Institute of Music alumni
Musicians from Paterson, New Jersey
New York University alumni
Princeton University faculty
Vassar College faculty
Wellesley College faculty
Westminster Choir College faculty
Male classical organists